Whampoa East is one of the 22 constituencies of the Kowloon City District Council. The seat elects one member of the council every four years. The boundary is loosely based on the eastern area of Whampoa Garden.

Councillors represented

Election results

2010s

2000s

1990s

Notes

Citations

References
2011 District Council Election Results (Kowloon City)
2007 District Council Election Results (Kowloon City)
2003 District Council Election Results (Kowloon City)
1999 District Council Election Results (Kowloon City)

Constituencies of Hong Kong
Constituencies of Kowloon City District Council
1994 establishments in Hong Kong
Constituencies established in 1994
Hung Hom